The British Association for Jewish Studies (BAJS) is an organization in the United Kingdom that promotes scholarly study of Jewish culture.

The society was founded in 1975 as a non-profit, professional organization. Its focus is on supporting and cultivating higher education in the British Isles relating to Jewish culture and history.  They also organize conferences and support research and publication.

The BAJS conducts a survey each year on what courses in Jewish studies are being offered at British universities.  The most recent report may be viewed through a link on the BAJS website.
The BAJS also holds two essay competitions annually. One is for undergraduates and the other for post-grads. The winners are awarded ￡200 each.

Leadership 
Past presidents of the BAJS have included:

 2021 Andrea Schatz
 2020 Helen Spurling
 2019 Hindy Najman
 2018 Julia Egorova
 2017 Hannah Holtschneider
 2016 Charlotte Hempel
 2015 Daniel Langton
 2014 Zuleika Rodgers
 2013 Larry Ray
 2012 Sacha Stern
 2011 Alison Salvesen
 2010 Sarah Pearce
 2009 Seth Kunin
 2008 Philip Alexander
 2007 Michael Berkowitz
 2006 Geoffrey Khan
 2005 Isabel Wollaston
 2004 Joanna Weinberg
 2003 Charles Thomas Robert Hayward 
 2002 Tony Kushner
 2001 Ada Rapaport-Albert
 2000 Avihai Shivtiel 
 1999 George J. Brooke
 1998 Raphael Loewe
 1997 John Klier
 1996 William Horbury
 1995 Martin Goodman
 1994 Norman Solomon
 1993 Bernard Jackson
 1992 Stefan Reif
 1991 Tessa Rajak
 1990 A. Peter Hayman
 1989 Nicholas de Lange
 1988 Geza Vermes
 1987 Philip Alexander 
 1985 John F.A. Sawyer
 1984 David Patterson
 1983 Chimen Abramsky
 1982 Benedikt Isserlin
 1981 Louis Jacobs
 1980 Judah Segal
 1979 E.J. Wiesenberg
 1978 James Barr
 1977 Erwin Rosenthal 
 1976 Jacob Weingreen
 1975 Geza Vermes

Membership
Membership in the BAJS is open to:

Scholars concerned with the field of Jewish Studies.
Graduate students in the field of Jewish Studies.
People outside of the United Kingdom with a “serious academic interest” in the field of Jewish Studies.
People within the United Kingdom and Ireland with a “serious academic interest in the field of Jewish Studies, but who are not professionals in the subject.

The first group, also known as “ordinary members,” are given voting rights at the association's meetings, as well as eligibility for committee membership and office positions.
The last two groups are not allowed voting rights, but are allowed to attend conferences.

An application for membership must include the names of two references, at least one of whom must be an ordinary member of BAJS.  The Committee considers the applications, then they are voted on at the annual general meeting.

Subscription fees or dues are also decided on at the annual general meeting.

See also
 British Association for Japanese Studies

References

External links
 

Educational organisations based in the United Kingdom
Judaic studies
Cultural studies organizations
Ethnic studies organizations
1975 establishments in the United Kingdom
Organizations established in 1975
Jews and Judaism in the United Kingdom